Michael Doran (November 1, 1827 – February 20, 1915) was a Minnesota politician and businessman.

Biography
Michael Doran was born in County Meath, Ireland on November 1, 1827. He emigrated to New York in 1850, then moved to Norwalk, Ohio, the following year. In 1855, he married Helen Brady of Norwalk. He took out a land claim in Kilkenny, Minnesota, (Le Sueur County) in 1856 and established a farm there the following year. His first wife died in 1862, leaving four young children.

Doran was elected county treasurer of Le Sueur County on the Democratic ticket in 1862, serving four successive terms. In 1865, he married his second wife, Catherine O'Grady. Nine children were born of this marriage.

In 1870, Doran was elected to the Minnesota State Senate from Le Sueur County and served several terms. In 1870 he moved from Kilkenny township to Le Sueur, Minnesota, and entered the banking business. In 1875, he went into the milling business at Le Sueur. Late in the 1870s, he entered into partnership in a banking and brokerage business in St. Paul, Minnesota.

He lived in Le Sueur until 1888, when he sold out his local interests, and moved to St. Paul, where he continued with his banking concerns.

Doran was chairman of the Minnesota Democratic State Central Committee on numerous occasions and was chairman of the National Democratic Committee from 1888 to 1896, when he resigned over differences with his party on bimetallism. He was a close political and personal friend of Grover Cleveland, who gave him the principal credit for procuring his third presidential nomination in 1892.

Doran died in St. Paul on February 20, 1915. He is the namesake of the city of Doran, Minnesota.

References

External links
 "Minnesota Territorial Pioneers - Biographical Sketches of Territorial Pioneers"

1827 births
Democratic Party Minnesota state senators
1915 deaths
19th-century American politicians